A constitutional referendum was held in Seychelles on 15 November 1992. Although the proposed new constitution received the support of 54.6% of voters, it failed to pass the 60% threshold required for adoption. Subsequently, a second constitutional commission was created and a second draft put to a referendum the following year.

Background
A constitution was drafted by a commission elected earlier in 1992. It provided for a presidential system, with presidents limited to three terms of five years. Half of the National Assembly would be elected proportionally based on the results of presidential elections, whilst amendments to the constitution would require a referendum, with changes to some articles requiring a three-fifths majority to be approved.

Results
Voters were asked the question "Do you approve the draft Constitution?"

References

Seychelles
1992 in Seychelles
1992
Constitutional referendums